Francis Roy  (born 29 August 1958) is a former British Labour Party politician, who was the Member of Parliament (MP) for Motherwell and Wishaw from 1997 to 2015. He was a Government Whip and Lord Commissioner of HM Treasury from 2006 to 2010, after having served as an Assistant Whip from 2005.

Early life

Roy was educated at Our Lady's High School, Motherwell, and later at Motherwell College (1992) and Glasgow Caledonian University in Consumer and Management Studies (1994).

Roy was, like many others in the area, a steelworker until he was made redundant in 1991 when Ravenscraig Steelworks closed. He describes the strikes of the 1980s as ensuring his "politicisation was cemented for life"

Political career
Roy worked as a parliamentary assistant to Helen Liddell MP before becoming MP for Motherwell and Wishaw.  He is the first MP born locally to represent Motherwell and Wishaw.

In 2001 Roy resigned as parliamentary private secretary to Helen Liddell in the wake of the cancellation of a visit to Carfin Grotto by Irish Taoiseach Bertie Ahern. Ahern was due to visit the grotto to open a memorial to victims of the Great Famine but the visit was cancelled due to Roy's advice of risk of possible sectarian violence, despite statements from Strathclyde Police that they did not consider the visit to be a security risk.

In 2015, Roy worked on Liz Kendall's unsuccessful bid for the Labour leadership.

He is the father of Brian Francis Roy, former general secretary of Scottish Labour.

Roy was appointed Commander of the Order of the British Empire (CBE) in the 2023 New Year Honours for political and public service.

References

External links
Frank Roy MP official site

1958 births
Living people
Scottish Labour MPs
Alumni of Glasgow Caledonian University
People educated at Our Lady's High School, Motherwell
UK MPs 1997–2001
UK MPs 2001–2005
UK MPs 2005–2010
UK MPs 2010–2015
Commanders of the Order of the British Empire